Vik (also Vikja or Viken) is a village in Sunnfjord Municipality in Vestland county, Norway.  The village is located on the north shore of the river Gaula, on the eastern end of the lake Viksdalsvatnet.  The village was formerly located in Gaular municipality in Sogn og Fjordane county, before the merging and creation of new municipalities and counties in Norway on 1 January 2020. The Norwegian County Road 13 highway runs through Vik, on its way from Sunnfjord to the north to Balestrand to the south.  The Viksdalen Church is located in the village, and it serves the people in the Viksdalen valley of eastern Gaular.  This has been a church site for centuries.  The first known church in Vik was named in historical records in 1360, so it was built sometime before then.

References

Villages in Vestland
Sunnfjord